White Oak is a census-designated place (CDP) in Hamilton County, Ohio, United States. It is seven miles northwest of Cincinnati. The population was 19,541 at the 2020 census. White Oak is situated in both Green Township and Colerain Township.

History
White Oak was originally known as Saint Jacobs in the 19th century.

Geography
White Oak is located at  (39.213993, -84.596903).

Demographics

As of the census of 2000, there were 13,277 people, 5,263 households, and 3,647 families living in the CDP. The population density was 3,242.7 people per square mile (1,253.4/km). There were 5,464 housing units at an average density of 1,334.5/sq mi (515.8/km). The racial makeup of the CDP was 93.88% White, 3.55% African American, 0.17% Native American, 1.09% Asian, 0.41% from other races, and 0.91% from two or more races. Hispanic or Latino of any race were 1.08% of the population.

There were 5,263 households, out of which 33.7% had children under the age of 18 living with them, 55.0% were married couples living together, 10.8% had a female householder with no husband present, and 30.7% were non-families. 26.4% of all households were made up of individuals, and 10.4% had someone living alone who was 65 years of age or older. The average household size was 2.52 and the average family size was 3.07.

In the CDP, the population was spread out, with 26.5% under the age of 18, 8.3% from 18 to 24, 29.2% from 25 to 44, 21.4% from 45 to 64, and 14.6% who were 65 years of age or older. The median age was 37 years. For every 100 females, there were 94.1 males. For every 100 females age 18 and over, there were 88.5 males.

The median income for a household in the CDP was $45,306, and the median income for a family was $55,736. Males had a median income of $41,728 versus $28,768 for females. The per capita income for the CDP was $23,687. About 3.9% of families and 5.1% of the population were below the poverty line, including 7.2% of those under age 18 and 6.0% of those age 65 or over.

References

Census-designated places in Hamilton County, Ohio
Census-designated places in Ohio